Susan Fereday ( Apthorpe) (1815,  Leicestershire, England – 21 October 1878, Sale, Victoria, Australia) was an algologist, botanical illustrator, artist and Sunday school teacher who made scientifically significant collections of botany specimens in Tasmania, Australia.  She was also a talented artist known for her accurate paintings of the local flora of Tasmania.

Life

Fereday was born Susan Georgina Marianne Apthorpe in Leicestershire, England in 1815. She married in 1837 and emigrated with her husband to Australia aboard the Aden in 1846.  Fereday lived in "The Grove" in George Town, Tasmania and used the local flora as inspiration for her paintings.  Fereday exhibited her art at the Melbourne Intercolonial Exhibition of 1866-1867.

Fereday was also a keen collector of algae specimens and established a scientifically significant collection. William Henry Harvey named two species after Fereday to honour her contribution to the study of algae, Dasya feredayae and Nemastoma feredayae.

Fereday Place in the Canberra suburb of Conder is named in her honour.

Family
Fereday married her husband the Reverend John Fereday in 1837 and had six children with him.

See also
List of Australian botanical illustrators

References

External links

List of paintings by Fereday held at the National Library of Australia
Images of "The Grove", the house where Fereday lived in Tasmania

1815 births
1878 deaths
19th-century Australian botanists
Artists from Tasmania
Botanical illustrators
19th-century Australian women scientists
Scientific illustrators
Phycologists
Women phycologists